John Henri Croisier (? – 1915) was a French composer and playwright.

Works 
He created pieces for piano and operettas for which he sometimes wrote both the music as well as the lyrics.
 
1880: L’Année féminine, calendrier inamovible
1894: Échos de La Varenne, valse, piano, with violon ad libitum accompagnement
1894: Joyeux départ, polka-marche, piano. Op. 8
1895: A l'ivresse, chanson bachique
1896: Avec toi !, polka-mazurka, piano
1896: Sérénade à Phoebé, suite de valses, piano
1896: Colombine-Colombinette, fantaisies, quadrille for piano
1897: Sans Fard, en vers... et pour tous, poems
1899: Nos petits lignards, polka-marche, piano
1899: Elle !, drame réaliste in 1 act, with Trébla
1900: L'Aigledindon, parodie bouffe in 1 act and 1 prologue, with Eugène Joullot
1902: L'Autruche tricolore, ou la Possédée de la rue du Caire, folie-vaudeville in 1 act, with Albert Pajol
1902: L'Enlèvement de Césarine, folie-vaudeville in 1 act, with Pajol
1902: Les Forfaits de Savarin, folie-vaudeville in 1 act, with Pajol
1902: Le Tueur de femmes, comédie-bouffe in 1 act, with Pajol
1902: Les Surprises de l'amour, folie-vaudeville in 1 act, with Pajol
1902: Le Choix d'une belle-mère, comédie bouffe in 1 act, with Pajol
1903: Ciel d'avril, valse, piano
1903: Derniers adieux, valse, piano
1903: De Carthage à Montmartre. Civita
1903: Helvétia-marche, march, piano

References

19th-century French dramatists and playwrights
20th-century French dramatists and playwrights
French operetta composers
French male classical composers
Year of birth missing
1915 deaths
19th-century classical composers
20th-century classical composers
19th-century French composers
French male dramatists and playwrights
19th-century male writers
20th-century male writers
20th-century French composers
20th-century French male musicians
19th-century French male musicians